Alfred Wallis (18 August 1855 – 29 August 1942) was a British fisherman and artist known for his port landscapes and shipping scenes painted in a naïve style. Having no artistic training, he began painting at the age of 70, using household paint on scraps of cardboard. He achieved little commercial success, although his work was championed by progressive artists such as Ben Nicholson and Christopher Wood.

Life and work

Alfred's parents, Charles and Jane Wallis, were from Penzance in Cornwall, and moved to Devonport, Devon, in 1850, to find work. Alfred and his brother Charles were born in Devonport. Later, when Jane Wallis died, the family returned to Penzance. Upon leaving school, Alfred was apprenticed to a basketmaker before becoming a mariner in the merchant service by the early 1870s. He sailed on schooners across the North Atlantic between Penzance and Newfoundland.

Wallis married Susan Ward in St Mary's Church, Penzance, in 1876, when he was 20 and his wife was 41. He became stepfather to her five children. He continued as a deep-sea fisherman on the Newfoundland run in the early days of his marriage, which allowed him to earn a good wage. After the death of his two infant children Alfred switched to local fishing and labouring in Penzance.

The family moved to St Ives, Cornwall, in 1890 where he established himself as a marine stores dealer, buying scrap iron, sails, rope and other items. In 1912, his business, "Wallis, Alfred, Marine Stores Dealer" closed and Alfred kept busy with odd jobs and worked for a local antiques dealer, Mr Armour, which provided some insight into the world of objets d'art.

Following his wife's death in 1922, Wallis took up painting, as he later told Jim Ede, "for company". He was self-taught, and never had an art lesson.

His paintings are an excellent example of naïve art; perspective is ignored and an object's scale is often based on its relative importance in the scene, giving many of his paintings a resemblance to early maps. Wallis painted seascapes from memory, in large part because the world of sail he knew was being replaced by steamships. As he put it, his subjects were "what use To Bee out of my memory what we may never see again ..." Having little money, Wallis used what materials were immediately available, mostly painting on cardboard torn from packing boxes and using a limited palette of paint bought from ship chandlers.

By fortunate coincidence, in 1928, a few years after he had started painting, Ben Nicholson and Christopher Wood came to St Ives and established an artist colony. They were delighted to find Wallis and celebrated his direct approach to image-making. Nicholson commented later that "to Wallis, his paintings were never 'paintings' but actual events". Wallis was propelled into a circle of some of the most progressive artists working in Britain in the 1930s.

The influence, however, was all one way; Wallis continued to paint as he always had. Nicholson later termed Wallis's art "something that has grown out of the Cornish seas and earth and which will endure".

Through Nicholson and Wood, Wallis was introduced to Jim Ede who promoted his work in London. Despite this attention, Wallis sold few paintings and continued to live in poverty until he died in the Madron workhouse near Penzance. He is buried in Barnoon cemetery, overlooking St Ives Porthmeor beach and the Tate St Ives gallery. An elaborate gravestone, made from tiles by the potter Bernard Leach and depicting a tiny mariner at the foot of a huge lighthouse – a popular motif in Wallis's paintings – covers the tomb.

Wallis thought his neighbours resented his fame, and that they believed him to be secretly rich. In one of his last letters, to Ede, he wrote:

Examples of Wallis's paintings can be seen at the Tate St Ives and at Kettle's Yard in Cambridge (Jim Ede's home). In October 2020, an exhibition titled "Alfred Wallis Rediscovered" opened at Kettle's Yard.

See also 
 List of St Ives artists

References

External links 

  Alfred Wallis Paintings by Max Wildman
 Images from the Tate gallery collection.
 

1855 births
1942 deaths
19th-century English painters
20th-century English painters
British marine artists
Burials in Cornwall
English male painters
Landscape artists
Naïve painters
Artists from Devonport, Plymouth
St Ives artists
19th-century English male artists
20th-century English male artists